7 Mages (Czech: Brány Skeldalu: 7 Mágů, literally Gates of Skeldal: 7 Mages) is a 2016 video game developed by Napoleon Games. It is the third installment in Gates of Skeldal series. 7 Mages a tactical, turn-based game with that focuses on musical magic. Each character has a tune they can play to directly affect anyone within earshot.

The story is an adaptation of Akira Kurosawa's benchmark film, Seven Samurai.

Gameplay
7 Mages is a dungeon crawler that features gameplay similar to the original Gates of Skeldal. The player moves squares in real-time, but battles are turn-based. Each mage has some specialization, such as being a warrior or archer.

There are multiple types of magic, such as elemental magic and musical magic etc. Musical magic uses instruments, and its effect weakens with larger distances. Magic can heal, refill mana, resurrect dead companions, etc.

Reception
7 Mages hold 90% at Metacritic.

TouchArcade praised the game play. It noted the puzzles, though "its approach is probably not going to gel with everyone." Another praise was for the combat system and dungeon design. The story was noted to be a weaker part of the game.

7 Mages won Czech Game of the Year Award for the Best story.

External links

References

2016 video games
Role-playing video games
Fantasy video games
Video games developed in the Czech Republic
Windows games
Android (operating system) games
IOS games
Dungeon crawler video games
Video game sequels
Early access video games
MacOS games
Linux games
Single-player video games
Napoleon Games games